"Neva Get Enuf" is the second single released from 3LW's second album A Girl Can Mack and features Lil Wayne, it heavily samples Teddy Pendergrass's "Close the Door". The song is a trio but the video was released by the group as a duo, after the exit of group member Naturi Naughton and before the introduction of Jessica Benson in her place. Naughton's vocals are still present on the track.

The single failed to chart on the Billboard Hot 100.

Track listing
 "Neva Get Enuf" (LP Version)
 "Neva Get Enuf" (No Rap Edit)
 "Neva Get Enuf" (A Cappella)

Official versions/remixes
 "Neva Get Enuf" (Call Out Hook)
 "Neva Get Enuf" (Instrumental)
 "Neva Get Enuf" (The Spa Remix)

Charts

Release history

References

2002 singles
3LW songs
Lil Wayne songs
Songs written by Leon Huff
Songs written by Kenny Gamble
Songs written by Lil Wayne
2002 songs